François Henri (14 April 1903 – 23 October 1980) was a French racing cyclist. He rode in the 1928 Tour de France.

References

1903 births
1980 deaths
French male cyclists
Place of birth missing